is a city located in Okinawa Prefecture, Japan. As of 2012, the city has an estimated population of 60,004 and a population density of 3117 persons per km². The total area is 19.25 km².

On April 1, 2002, the administrative status of Tomigusuku was changed from village (Japanese: 村; son) to city (Japanese: 市; shi). Until then it had been the largest village in Japan.

Climate

Notable people
Kamejiro Senaga, politician
Hirokazu Nema, basketball coach
Takako Uehara, singer (Speed)
Toshimitsu Higa, baseball player
Mr Miyagi, fictional character , Karate Kid Movies

See also

Tomigusuku Castle

References

External links

 Tomigusuku City official website 
 

Cities in Okinawa Prefecture